Zhambyl District is a district of North Kazakhstan Region in northern Kazakhstan. Population:

References

Districts of Kazakhstan
North Kazakhstan Region